"Dat Stick" (styled as "Dat $tick") is the debut single by Indonesian rapper Rich Brian, previously known as Rich Chigga. It was released on March 11, 2016. The song was produced by Ananta Vinnie.

Background
Rich Brian released the song on March 11, 2016 on streaming services.

Music video
The video of Dat Stick was uploaded to Brian's YouTube channel on February 22, 2016, which became quickly viral over the internet. Rappers such as Desiigner, Cam'ron, Ghostface Killah, 21 Savage, MadeinTYO and many more have reacted to the video.

Remix
On October 12, 2016, the official remix of "Dat Stick" was released, which features American rappers Ghostface Killah and Pouya.

Charts

Certifications

References

External links
Lyrics of this song at Genius

2016 debut singles
2016 songs
Rich Brian songs
Songs written by Rich Brian